Events from the year 1623 in art.

Events
 The Raphael Cartoons are bought from a Genoese collection by agents for the future King Charles I of England (at this time Prince of Wales).

Works

Gian Lorenzo Bernini – Self-portrait (approximate date)
Martin Droeshout – Engraved portrait for the 'First Folio' of William Shakespeare's plays
Orazio Gentileschi – The Annunciation (Sabauda Gallery)
Guercino – The Burial of St. Petronilla
Dirck Hals – Musicians
Daniël Mijtens – James Hamilton, Earl of Arran (age 17)
Peter Paul Rubens – Self-portrait (British Royal Collection, Windsor Castle)
Dirck van Baburen (some dates approximate)
Cimon and Pero (Roman Charity)
Concert
Crowning With Thorns (2 versions)
Loose Company
Prometheus Being Chained by Vulcan
Saint Sebastian Tended by Irene
Anthony van Dyck – 
Portrait of the Lomellini family
Self Portrait (approximate date)
Gerard van Honthorst
Merry Company
The Prodigal Son
The Steadfast Philosopher
Diego Velázquez
Portrait of Philip IV in Armour
The Investiture Of St Ildefonso With The Chasuble

Births
May 30 - Wallerant Vaillant, Flemish Baroque painter and mezzotint engraver (died 1677)
August 25 - Filippo Lauri, Italian painter, Principe (director) of the Accademia di San Luca (died 1694)
date unknown
Jürgen Ovens, Danish or German Baroque painter and engraver (died 1678)
Francesco Barbieri, Italian Baroque painter (died 1698)
Giovanni Battista Caccioli  Italian figure painter in quadratura (died 1675)
Francisco de Palacios, Spanish Baroque painter (died 1652)
Francesco di Maria, Italian painter active mainly in Naples (died 1690)
Pieter Janssens Elinga, Dutch painter (died 1682)
Giovanni Ghisolfi, Italian painter of veduta and capricci, mainly landscapes (died 1683)
Giacomo Lauri, Italian engraver (died 1694)
probable 
Thomas Simon, English medallist (died 1665)
Mei Qing, Chinese landscape painter, calligrapher and poet during the Qing dynasty (died 1697)
Reinier Nooms, Dutch marine painter and etcher (died c. 1664)

Deaths
January 11 - Pieter van Mierevelt, Dutch Golden Age painter (born 1596)
December - Rodrigo de Villandrando, court painter during the reign of Philip III of Spain (born unknown)
date unknown
Andrea Andreani, Italian wood engraver and early exponent of chiaroscuro (born 1540)
Francesco Brizio, Italian painter and engraver of the Bolognese School (born 1574)
Agostino Bugiardini, Italian sculptor (date of birth unknown)
Johann Theodor de Bry, Flemish painter and engraver (born 1561)
Domenico Fetti, Italian painter (born 1589)
Jacob van Musscher, Dutch Golden Age painter (born 1580)

 
Years of the 17th century in art
1620s in art